Georg Pezolt, also Petzoldt or Petzold (8 May 1810, Salzburg - 28 October 1878, Salzburg) was an Austrian painter, architect and art critic, who became the first monument conservator in Salzburg.

Life and work 
He served a apprenticeship with the still-life painter, . At the age of seventeen, he accompanied him on a trip to Italy, with an archaeological expedition for which Wurzer was serving as a sketch artist. He returned to Salzburg in 1837, where he initially focused on painting, but would later issue a book of 144 lithographs; Most interesting points from Salzburg, Tyrol and the Salzkammergut.

After 1850, he began to spend more time devoting himself to other tasks. Through the high esteem for his works expressed by Archbishop Schwarzenberg, and his later work as a conservator, he came to have a significant influence on ecclesiastical art in the region. He was also a significant contributor to the development of the Salzburg Museum and a respected member of the Salzburger Kunstverein (Artists' Association). In addition, he took some students; notably Josef Mayburger, who was only four years his junior.

At first, he favored imagery based on ancient Roman art, but gradually became more attracted to the work of the Nazarene movement, which created an intellectual conflict with his scholarly pursuits. Although generally praised, he came under some criticism for relying too much on his imagination, rather than research.

What may be his most notable restoration involved the tower of the Franciscan Church, built in 1498. His only original architectural work was the "Borromäus Church", in Neo-Byzantine style, on the Mirabellplatz in the  district. It was demolished in 1972.

Sources 
 
 F. Martin: "Petzoldt (Pezolt), Georg". In: Hans Vollmer (Ed.): Allgemeines Lexikon der Bildenden Künstler von der Antike bis zur Gegenwart, Vol.26: Olivier–Pieris. E. A. Seemann, Leipzig 1932, pg.517
 
 Peter Keller (Ed.): Ein Traum von einer Stadt: Georg Pezolt (1810–1878) und Salzburg. Dommuseum zu Salzburg, 2011.

External links 

 More works by Pezolt @ ArtNet
 

1810 births
1878 deaths
Austrian painters
Austrian landscape painters
Austrian architects
Conservation and restoration of cultural heritage
Artists from Salzburg